The Future Is Unknown is an album by Unknown Hinson. It was released in 1999 by Uniphone Records. It was re-issued in 2004 by Capitol Records.

Critical reception
AllMusic wrote: "Now and then, [Hinson] moves from twangy country to rock rhythms and screaming guitar solos, if only to send up rock culture ('Hippie Girl', 'Rock 'n Roll Is Straight From Hell'). It's all in fun, and there are some excellent candidates for the Dr. Demento radio show, even if this isn't the most original comedy around." Country Standard Time called it "a triumph of character-based satire."

Track listing (Uniphone)
All tracks composed by Unknown Hinson
Venus Bound
I Make Faces (When I Make Love)
Desert Luau
In the Trunk of My Cadillac Car
Man to Man
Closer to the Light
Don't Bite the Lips that Kiss You
Foggy Windows
Silver Platter
Put Out or Get Out
Sweet Pain
Hippie Girl
My Heart's on the Line
Fish Camp Woman (Live)
Pregnant Again
Rock 'n' Roll is Straight from Hell
Don't Look at Me
Theme from "The Unknown Hinson TV Show" (Instrumental)

Track listing (Reissue)
All tracks composed by Unknown Hinson
I Ain't Afraid of Your Husband - 1:30
I Make Faces (When I Make Love) - 3:58
Polly Urethane - 3:32
Hippie Girl - 4:03
Your Man... - 3:01
Lingerie - 3:11
Venus Bound - 3:34
Foggy Windows - 2:48
I Cleaned Out a Room (In My Trailer for You) - 2:51
Man to Man - 3:37
Peace, Love and Hard Liquor - 3:16
Pregnant Again - 2:15
I Quit All That Mess - 3:24
Rock 'N Roll Is Straight from Hell - 2:46
Unknown Hinson Theme (Instrumental) - 0:51

Personnel
Unknown Hinson - all instruments

References

2000 albums
Unknown Hinson albums